The most popular sport in Russia is soccer. According to Yandex search analysis results rating of the most popular sports among Russians: "Football topped the list of the most popular sports in Russia" with 5 to 10 million requests. Ice Hockey came in second with handball, basketball, futsal, boxing, auto racing, volleyball, athletics, tennis and chess rounding out the top ten rankings. Other popular sports include bandy, biathlon, figure skating, weightlifting, gymnastics, wrestling, martial arts, rugby union, and skiing.

The Soviet Union (USSR) competed in the Olympic Games for the first time at the 1952 Summer Olympics. Soviet and later Russian athletes never finished below fourth place in the number of gold and total medals collected at the Summer Olympics in which they competed. Russia has the most medals stripped for doping violations (51), the most of any country, four times the number of the runner-up, and nearly a third of the global total. The Russian team was partially banned from the 2016 Rio Olympics and 2018 Winter Olympics due to the state-sponsored doping scandal. Russian athletes were allowed to participate at the 2018 Olympics under a neutral flag with a name "Olympic Athletes from Russia".

After the 2022 Russian invasion of Ukraine, the International Olympic Committee (IOC) condemned Russia's "breach of the Olympic Truce adopted by the UN General Assembly".  The IOC called on individual federations to ban Russian athletes from participating in any international events until further notice. The IOC also withdrew the Olympic Order from Vladimir Putin. The International Paralympic Committee on 3 March banned Russian athletes from competing at the 2022 Winter Paralympics.

Football

Football is the number one sport in the country. A high proportion of men are interested in it to a certain extent (and many children play it regularly) and women also join men when it comes to the national team. The Russian Premier League has a fairly high degree of competitiveness. Notable foreign players have played in the league as well as local  players.

Russia was awarded the 2018 FIFA World Cup on 2 December 2010, hosting the tournament for the first time. The event took place from 14 June to 15 July 2018, in which the Russian team had its best performance since the 1966 tournament, reaching the quarter-finals for the first time since the breakup of the Soviet Union, where they lost to eventual finalists Croatia.

On 28 February 2022, due to the 2022 Russian invasion of Ukraine and in accordance with a recommendation by the International Olympic Committee (IOC), FIFA and UEFA suspended the participation of Russia, including in the Qatar 2022 World Cup. The Russian Football Union unsuccessfully appealed the FIFA and UEFA bans to the Court of Arbitration for Sport, which upheld the bans.

Ice hockey

The Kontinental Hockey League (KHL) is made up mostly of Russian teams. Russian teams have won every KHL championship. Russia has won the World Championships a number of times:

After the 2022 Russian invasion of Ukraine, the International Ice Hockey Federation suspended Russia from all levels of competition.

Bandy

One traditionally popular sport is bandy (informally called "Russian hockey"). It is considered a national sport, and is one of the biggest spectator sports. According to one survey, it is the third most popular sport in Russia. The Federation of International Bandy was founded in 1955, by the Soviet Union and three Nordic countries. Bandy is the only sport to enjoy the patronage of the Russian Orthodox Church since they're very interested in strengthening their national traditions.

The Soviet national team won all the Bandy World Championships from the start 1957 until 1979. After 10 rounds of the 2011–2012 Russian Bandy League the average attendance was 3,887. The national team for women took the silver medal in the six first World Championships. In the 2014 WCS, the first gold medal came.

After the International Olympic Committee’s recommendations following the 2022 Russian invasion of Ukraine, the Federation of International Bandy excluded Russia from participating in the 2022 Women's Bandy World Championship. The men's 2020 Bandy World Championship, since before postponed to 2022 due to the COVID-19 pandemic, was to be held in Russia but was cancelled on 1 March 2022, after Finland, Sweden, Norway, and the United States announced that they would not take part in the competition in Russia due to the Russian invasion of Ukraine. Before the start of their games, the players of four Russian bandy teams formed a ‘Z’ on the field, which is the letter symbolizing the Russian tanks that have invaded Ukraine.

Biathlon 
Biathlon is the most popular winter sport in Russia and ranking 1st in overall polls and TV viewership for the winter seasons. Russia has had successful biathletes and has won Olympic and World medals. As a result of the 2022 Russian invasion of Ukraine, the International Biathlon Union banned the participation of Russian athletes and officials at its international events, and began procedures to suspend the Russian Biathlon Federation.

Figure skating
 Figure skating is another popular sport in Russia.  In the 1960s the Soviet Union won a number of medals in figure skating, especially in pairs skating and ice dancing. At every Winter Olympics from 1964 through 2006, a Soviet or Russian pair won gold. The streak ended in 2010 when a Chinese pair won gold in 2010 Winter Olympics, a Russian pair returned to winning gold in pairs at the 2014 Winter Olympics in Sochi.

The Russian Figure Skating Championships are held annually to determine the national champions of Russia. Skaters compete in men's singles, women's singles, pair skating, and ice dancing. The first Russian national competition was held in 1878 in St. Petersburg. Between 1924 and 1990 Russian national championships in figure skating were not held. During this time, Russian skaters competed at the Soviet Figure Skating Championships.

After the 2022 Russian invasion of Ukraine, the International Skating Union banned all athletes from Russia from events until further notice.

Speed skating 

Long track speed skating has a tradition in Russia since the Russian Empire, and then in the Soviet Union. After the collapse of the Soviet Union, the Russian Federation won medals in speed skating in World Championships and World Cups. Although short track speed skating is not as popular as long track in terms of results in Russia, it saw a major boost in popularity after the 2014 Sochi Olympics.

After the 2022 Russian invasion of Ukraine, the International Skating Union banned all speed skating athletes from Russia from events until further notice.

Other winter sports
Other winter sports the Soviets and Russians have participated in are bobsleigh, skeleton, and luge.

After the 2022 Russian invasion of Ukraine, the International Bobsleigh and Skeleton Federation suspended the participation of Russian athletes and officials. It also suspended the Bobsleigh Federation of Russia until its next Congress in July 2022.

Also after the Russian invasion, the International Luge Federation banned all Russian athletes, coaches, and officials from its events. It also suspended all Russian officials appointed to its Commissions and Working Groups by the Executive Board, and made Russia ineligible to host any of its events.

Tennis

Russia has produced a number of successful tennis players. Russians Maria Sharapova and Dinara Safina reached number one in the WTA rankings. Anastasia Myskina won the 2004 French Open. Sharapova won five Grand Slam titles.  The Russian Federation won the Fed Cup 4 times, in 2004, 2005, 2007, and 2008. At the 2008 Beijing Olympics, Russia swept the women's tennis podium with Elena Dementieva winning the gold, Safina and Vera Zvonareva the silver and bronze. As of January 2022, one Russian woman was ranked in the WTA tour's top 20, Anastasia Pavlyuchenkova.

Marat Safin and Yevgeny Kafelnikov are amongst Russia's most successful male players. They  won two Grand Slam titles each, with Kafelnikov winning the 1996 French Open and 1999 Australian Open. Safin won the US Open in 2000, and the 2005 Australian Open. Kafelnikov also won a gold medal at the 2000 Olympic Games. The Russian men won three Davis Cup titles (2002, 2006, 2021)  and one ATP Cup (2021). Russia has also seen new talent come through the men’s rankings with Daniil Medvedev, who briefly reached number one in the rankings in early 2022, and Andrey Rublev. Medvedev won the 2021 US Open against Novak Djokovic, and has reached three other grand slam finals; the 2019 US Open, where he lost to Rafael Nadal, the 2021 Australian Open which he lost to Djokovic, and the 2022 Australian Open, which he also lost to Nadal. Other notable Russian players include Nikolay Davydenko, who won the ATP Finals in 2009, Mikhail Youzhny and Karen Khachanov.

In reaction to the 2022 Russian invasion of Ukraine, the Association of Tennis Professionals (ATP) moved the 2022 St. Petersburg Open from Saint Petersburg to  Kazakhstan.  The International Tennis Federation (ITF) cancelled all events in Russia. The ITF also excluded Russia from international team events, which include the Davis Cup, the Billie Jean King Cup, and the ATP Cup, and suspended the Russian Tennis Federation. However, the ATP and the WTA refused to yield to international pressure to ban individual players from competition. Russian players will carry on, but not play under the Russian national flag.

In April 2022, the organisers of the Wimbledon Championships, a grand slam-level event in London, United Kingdom, banned players representing Russia from entering the 2022 edition of the competition. The LTA, the British tennis association, also banned players representing Russia from smaller tennis tournaments based in the UK. In response, the ATP, WTA, and ITF stripped Wimbledon of its ranking points, with their concerns being based on the principle of participation based on merit, rather than nationality, as well as the unilateral decision by Wimbledon, in contrast with the remainder of the tour.

Volleyball

 Gold medals (2002, 2011, 2013),5 silver medals (1993, 1998, 2000, 2007, 2010), 6 bronze medals (1997, 1997, 2001, 2006, 2008, 2009)

The Russian women's national volleyball team is ranked 8th in the FIVB World Rankings. Record for achievements of the Russian women's volleyball team:
 2 Olympic silver medals (2000 and 2004)
 2 FIVB World Championships gold medals (2006 and 2010)
 1 FIVB Volleyball World Grand Champions Cup gold medal (1997), 1 silver medal (2001), and 1 bronze medal (1993)

Russia featured a women's national team in beach volleyball that competed at the 2018–2020 CEV Beach Volleyball Continental Cup.

In response to the 2022 Russian invasion of Ukraine, the International Volleyball Federation suspended all Russian national teams, clubs, and officials, as well as beach and snow volleyball athletes, from all events, and stripped Russia of the right to host the 2022 FIVB Volleyball Men's World Championship in August 2022, and will relocate games that were to be in Russia in June and July. The European Volleyball Confederation (CEV) also banned all Russian national teams, clubs, and officials from participating in European competition, and suspended all members of Russia from their respective functions in CEV organs.

Basketball
Basketball is a popular sport in Russia. The Russian national basketball team followed the Soviet Union national basketball team, and has won several international titles.

After the 2022 Russian invasion of Ukraine, the International Basketball Federation (FIBA) banned Russian teams and officials. EuroLeague suspended CSKA Moscow, UNICS Kazan, and Zenit St. Petersburg. Eurocup Basketball suspended PBC Lokomotiv Kuban. EuroLeague Women suspended UMMC Ekaterinburg, Dynamo Kursk, and MBA Moscow. The National Basketball Association (NBA) suspended all business activities in Russia, including broadcasts.

Rugby union

Rugby union is played in Russia. Russia was ranked 25th worldwide by the International Rugby Board (IRB) in March 2022, with over 100 clubs and close to 20,000 players nationally. Russian domestic rugby went professional in 2005 with the launch of the Professional Rugby League.

Rugby football in the Russian Empire pre-dated the Russian Revolution by a number of years, but was only played sporadically. It appears to have been the first (non-indigenous) football code to be played in Russia, around a decade before the introduction of association football.  In 1886, however, the Russian police clamped down on rugby because they considered it "brutal, and liable to incite demonstrations and riots" Russia competed in the 2011 Rugby World Cup in New Zealand.

After the 2022 Russian invasion of Ukraine, World Rugby and Rugby Europe suspended Russia from international and European continental rugby union competition. In addition, the Rugby Union of Russia was suspended from World Rugby and Rugby Europe.

Rugby league

In rugby league, Russia was ranked 35th worldwide by the Rugby League International Federation (RLIF) as of March 2022, with over 2,000 participants nationwide. Russian domestic rugby league is played at youth, student, and adult levels.

After the 2022 Russian invasion of Ukraine, the International Rugby League and European Rugby League banned Russia from all international rugby league competitions.

Australian rules football
The first Australian rules football clubs in Russia were created in 2011, in Moscow and Krasnoyarsk. Russia competed at the 2011 Australian Football League 9s Euro Cup in Belfast. In 2015 St. Petersburg Cats team firstly took part in ANZAC Cup. In 2016 Russian national team took part in Australian Football League Europe Cup.

Fencing 

Fencing in Tsarist Russia was a popular sport among the Russian elites. It transitioned in the Soviet Union as a sport for fencing enthusiasts and became a visible sport for the Soviet people which reached its peak in the 1980s in terms of success and popularity. After the dissolution of the Soviet Union, like the former Soviet Republic of Ukraine, Russia continued to have success in fencing, producing multiple world and European champions.
 	
After the 2022 Russian invasion of Ukraine, the International Fencing Federation (FIE) banned Russia and Belarus athletes and officials. It cancelled or will relocate all events in Russia and Belarus. FIE Russian President Alisher Usmanov stepped down after the European Union imposed economic sanctions on him.

Gymnastics

Before the breakup of the Soviet Union in 1991, the Soviet women's gymnastics squad won all team titles in World Championship competition and at the Summer Olympics, other than the 1984 Olympics, which they did not attend, and the 1966, 1979, and 1987 World Championships. Some of the Soviet gymnasts were from the Russian SFSR. Russia has medalled at every Worlds and Olympic competition in both MAG and WAG disciplines, except in the 2008 Olympics, where the Russian women team did not win any medals.

Rhythmic gymnastics is a popular sport in Russia.  There are many rhythmic gymnastics clubs in Russia, including the Gazprom School at which Irina Viner teaches rhythmic gymnasts in Novogorsk, Moscow, where the Russian national team is also based.

After the 2022 Russian invasion of Ukraine, the International Gymnastics Federation (FIG) barred Russian athletes and officials, including judges. It also announced that "all FIG World Cup and World Challenge Cup events planned to take place in Russia ... are cancelled, and no other FIG events will be allocated to Russia ... until further notice." FIG also banned the Russian flag at its events.

Swimming and diving

Swimming is mostly an elite sport for most Russians; however, before the dissolution of the USSR, swimming was an institutionalized and recreational sport. Russia has not achieved the same success as that of the Soviet Union.

In March 2022, after the 2022 Russian invasion of Ukraine, FINA banned all Russians from competing at the 2022 World Aquatics Championships, and withdrew the 2022 FINA World Swimming Championships (25 m) from being held in Russia. This came after indefinitely banning athletes and officials of Russia from wearing the colours of Russia, swimming representing Russia with Russia's name, and the playing of Russia's national anthem in the case an athlete from Russia won an event.

Athletics

Russia has maintained strong results particularly in High jump, Long jump, track athletics, Hurdling, Pole vault, racewalking, Hammer throw, Triple jump, Javelin throw, Heptathlon.

Russia was banned from the 2017 and 2019 World Championships because of state-sponsored doping.

Orienteering

The Russian Orienteering Federation is the Russian national organisation of orienteering. It is a suspended member of the International Orienteering Federation.

After the 2022 Russian invasion of Ukraine, the International Orienteering Federation suspended the membership of the Russian Orienteering Federation. The IOF also disallowed Russian orienteering athletes from participating in IOF events, even as neutral athletes, cancelled all organising rights for IOF events and activities in Russia, and suspended all Russian members appointed to IOF official bodies.

Boxing

Russia has had a number of boxing world title holders and Olympic champions.

Judo 
The popularity of judo in Russia increased with President Vladimir Putin promoting the sport, and Russia producing multiple Olympic and world champions.

After the 2022 Russian invasion of Ukraine, the International Judo Federation (IJF) removed Putin, who is a judo enthusiast, as Honorary President and ambassador. The IJF also removed Russian Arkady Rotenberg as member of the IJF's executive committee.  It also cancelled all competitions in Russia, but allowed their athletes to compete as neutral athletes.

Martial arts

Mixed martial arts is a popular sport producing many world class international and national fighters. Other popular martial arts form is Sambo which originated in the Soviet Union.

Weightlifting

Weightlifting is another successful sport in Russia, after the dissolution of the Soviet Union.

A strongman competition in Russia is Powerlifting, which is akin to a variant evolving from weightlifting. Russia is an active in the International Powerlifting Federation and one of the most successful countries along with the United States, Poland, Norway, United Kingdom, Taiwan, Sweden, Finland, Japan, and Ukraine. Maryana Naumova is the youngest world champion and multiple record holders in professional powerlifting tournaments and world championships.

Wrestling

Russia has produced multiple Olympic and World wrestling champions. Wrestling is the most accessible and played out sport for boys and young adults in Russia especially in the Caucasus Republics and regions (Chechnya, Dagestan, Karachay-Cherkessia, North-Ossetia, Kabardino-Balkaria, Ingushetia).

Futsal
Russia has both men and women futsal teams. Because of the 2022 Russian invasion of Ukraine, FIFA and Union of European Football Associations (UEFA) suspended from FIFA and UEFA competitions all Russian teams, whether national representative teams or club teams.

Handball

Handball is popular in Russia. In reaction to the 2022 Russian invasion of Ukraine, the International Handball Federation banned Russian and Belarus athletes and officials, and the European Handball Federation suspended the national teams of Russia and Belarus as well as Russian and Belarusian clubs competing in European handball competitions. Referees, officials, and commission members from Russia and Belarus will not be called upon for future activities. And new organisers will be sought for the YAC 16 EHF Beach Handball EURO and the Qualifier Tournaments for the Beach Handball EURO 2023, which were to be held in Moscow.

Chess

Chess is a favorite pastime, and a sport that has been dominated by Russians in the post-war (1945–) era. The winner of the 1948 World Chess Championship, Russian Mikhail Botvinnik, started an era of Soviet dominance in the chess world. Until the end of the Soviet Union, there was only one non-Soviet champion.

The 1990s were dominated by Kasparov, who won most of the tournaments that he participated in and reached a then-record rating of 2851 on the July 1999 list. In 2017, 25 of the world's top 100 chess players are Russian.

Motorcycle racing
Motorcycle racing is popular in Russia.  Fédération Internationale de Motocyclisme (FIM) banned all Russian and Belarusian motorcycle riders, teams, officials, and competitions. It cancelled one of the 2022 Speedway Grand Prix events, FIM Speedway GP of MFR – Togliatti, which was supposed to be held in Tolyatti on 9 July, stating that "in the current circumstances it is not possible to hold the FIM Speedway GP of MFR Togliatti."

Motorsport

Vitaly Petrov became Russia's first Formula One driver in 2010. He drove in F1 for three seasons with the Renault and Caterham F1 teams, and finished third at the 2011 Australian Grand Prix. Daniil Kvyat made his debut in F1 in 2014, and took  second place at the 2015 Hungarian Grand Prix. The Russian Grand Prix joined the calendar for the 2014 Formula One season, held at the Sochi Autodrom. Sergey Sirotkin joined the grid in 2018 but did not continue after that season. Nikita Mazepin became the 4th Russian driver to compete in Formula 1, for Haas F1 Team. He did compete in the 2021 Formula One World Championship, but due to the Russia Doping Scandal, he competed as a neutral competitor.

In 2022, the Russian Grand Prix, in the Sochi Autodrom, was scheduled to go ahead, but due to the 2022 Russian invasion of Ukraine, the FIA cancelled the race. After the Russian invasion led to sanctions from the EU, including some against Uralkali, a company owned by Nikita Mazepin's father, Haas sacked him ahead of the first race.

Also due to the invasion, the Fédération Internationale de l'Automobile (FIA) banned Russia teams, and banned the holding of competitions in Russia. It also excluded Russian  FIA members from their roles as elected officers or commission members, and banned FIA grants to Russian members. Individual Russia competitors were allowed to enter races as neutrals, without their national symbols, flags, colors, and anthems. British motorsport governing body Motorsport UK barred Russian and Belarusian drivers from competing in British motorsport events, thus preventing Russian F1 driver Nikita Mazepin from participating in the upcoming 2022 edition of the British Grand Prix in Silverstone scheduled to be held in July (in any event, he was sacked by his team), with Motorsport Australia considering a similar move.

Timur Timerzyanov has enjoyed success in rallycross, winning the FIA European Rallycross Championship in 2012 and 2013.

Russian car manufacturer Lada (known domestically as AvtoVAZ) has competed in the World Touring Car Championship, making their debut in 2008 with Russian Bears Motorsport entering Lada 110s. Lada provided factory support in 2009, with the team running three cars and upgrading to the Lada Priora during the season. The team's best performances were a pair of sixth places by James Thompson at the Race of Italy. Lada subsequently withdrew from the championship, but they returned in 2012, entering a Lada Granta WTCC driven by Thompson at a couple of race meetings. Subsequently, they announced plans to contest a full season in 2013. The team ran two cars in 2013, with a best result of a fifth place for Thompson in the Race of Russia, and expanded to a three car squad for 2014. Former World Touring Car Champion Robert Huff gave Lada their first WTCC win at the 2014 Beijing round.

See also

 Sport in Saint Petersburg
 Lapta (game)

References

Further reading
 Andreff, Wladimir, Oleg Bril, and Sandrine Poupaux. "Sport in Russia." in Sports Governance in the World. A Socio-Historic Approach (2012): 195-218 online.
 Arnold, Richard. "Sport and official nationalism in modern Russia." Problems of post-communism 65.2 2018): 129-141.
 Harte, Tim. Faster, Higher, Stronger, Comrades! Sports, Art, and Ideology in Late Russian and Early Soviet Culture (U of Wisconsin Press, 2020) online review
 Poupaux S. "Soviet and post-Soviet sport," in W. Andreff, S. Szymanski, eds., The Handbook on the Economics of Sport (Edward Elgar, 2006) pp. 316–324.
 Riordan, James. Sport in Soviet society: development of sport and physical education in Russia and the USSR (1980).
 Wagg, Stephen, and David L. Andrews, eds. East plays west: Sport and the Cold War (Routledge, 2007).